Dan Shorey was an English former Grand Prix motorcycle road racer.

Shorey was the son of a Banbury, England motorcycle garage owner. His best season was in 1968 when he finished the year in ninth place in the 500cc world championship. In 1958, he teamed with Mike Hailwood to win the Thruxton 500 endurance race.

References 

Year of birth missing (living people)
Living people
Sportspeople from Banbury
English motorcycle racers
50cc World Championship riders
250cc World Championship riders
350cc World Championship riders
500cc World Championship riders
Isle of Man TT riders
Place of birth missing (living people)